Blepharomyia pagana is a species of fly in the family Tachinidae.

Distribution
Austria, Belarus, Belgium, Bulgaria, Czech Republic, Denmark, Finland, France, Germany, Greece, Hungary, Italy, Lithuania, Netherlands, Norway, Poland, Russia, Slovakia, Spain, Sweden, Switzerland, Ukraine and United Kingdom

References

Diptera of Europe
Dexiinae
Taxa named by Johann Wilhelm Meigen
Insects described in 1824